Tumanov is a Russian masculine surname of Armenian or/and Georgian origin, its feminine counterpart is Tumanova. It may refer to
Cyril Toumanoff (1913–1997), Russian-born American historian and genealogist
Tamara Toumanova (1919–1996), Russian-born American ballerina and actress

Russian-language surnames